Green King may refer to:

 Greene King, UK pub chain and brewer
 Ulmus pumila 'Green King', an elm tree cultivar